Mongolonyx is an extinct genus of carnivorous mesonychid mammal that lived during the Middle Eocene in Inner Mongolia (China) and became extinct during the Oligocene. It was described by Szalay and Gould.

Mongolonyx fossils have been found in the Irdin Manha beds, in Inner Mongolia. It was a huge carnivorous animal comparable in size to a large bear.

Species
Mongolonyx dolichognathus
Mongolonyx robustus

References

External links
Digital Library
Paleo Data
Science
Ancient Research

Mesonychids
Eocene mammals of Asia
Oligocene mammals of Asia
Prehistoric placental genera